Richard William Murphy (born July 29, 1929) is an American diplomat and career member of the foreign service.

Biography

Early life
Richard William Murphy was born on July 29, 1929 in Boston, Massachusetts. After graduating from Phillips Exeter Academy in 1947, he received BAs from Harvard University in 1951 and from Emmanuel College, University of Cambridge in 1953. From 1953 to 1955, he served in the U.S. Army.

Career
He started his career in the United States Foreign Service as Vice Consul in Salisbury, Rhodesia (1955–58). From 1959 to 1971, he worked for the Middle Eastern Bureau. He was the United States ambassador to Mauritania from 1971 to 1974, to Syria from 1974 to 78, to the Philippines from 1978 to 1981, and to Saudi Arabia from 1981 to 1983. He served as the United States Assistant Secretary of State for Near Eastern and South Asian Affairs from 1983 to 1989.

From October 1, 1993 to June 30, 2004 he served as director of the Middle East Roundtable at the Council on Foreign Relations. He currently serves on the board of directors of UNRWA USA, a Washington-DC based 501c3 nonprofit which aims to educate the general American public about the situation of Palestine refugees and generate support for UNRWA's work.

He is a two-time recipient of the State Department's Superior Honor Award, and a three-time recipient of the President's Distinguished Service Award.

From 2003 to 2005 he was a Director of Middle East International, a London based bi-monthly magazine providing news and analysis of events in the Middle East.

Personal life
He is married to Anne Cook and has three children, and seven grandchildren.

References

External links
 "Nomination of Richard W. Murphy to be an Assistant Secretary of State" at the Ronald Reagan Presidential Library
 Middle East Rountable, at the Council on Foreign Relations
 

Ambassadors of the United States to Mauritania
Ambassadors of the United States to the Philippines
Ambassadors of the United States to Syria
United States Career Ambassadors
Harvard University alumni
People from Boston
1929 births
Living people
Alumni of Emmanuel College, Cambridge
Phillips Exeter Academy alumni
20th-century American diplomats